Thornton is a village in Cook County, Illinois, United States and a south suburb of Chicago. The population was 2,386 at the 2020 census. Thornton is home to the Thornton Quarry, one of the largest quarries in the world.

Geography
Thornton is located at  (41.571484, -87.611743).

Demographics
As of the 2020 census there were 2,386 people, 960 households, and 591 families residing in the village. The racial makeup of the village was 58.63% White, 22.76% African American, 0.21% Native American, 0.38% Asian, 0.00% Pacific Islander, 9.68% from other races, and 8.34% from two or more races. Hispanic or Latino of any race were 18.52% of the population.

There were 960 households, out of which 35.52% had children under the age of 18 living with them, 41.98% were married couples living together, 14.48% had a female householder with no husband present, and 38.44% were non-families. 31.35% of all households were made up of individuals, and 16.25% had someone living alone who was 65 years of age or older. The average household size was 3.07 and the average family size was 2.39.

The village's age distribution consisted of 15.9% under the age of 18, 11.1% from 18 to 24, 24.5% from 25 to 44, 32.2% from 45 to 64, and 16.5% who were 65 years of age or older. The median age was 43.8 years. For every 100 females, there were 92.2 males. For every 100 females age 18 and over, there were 87.2 males.

The median income for a household in the village was $66,447, and the median income for a family was $85,375. Males had a median income of $41,890 versus $39,329 for females. The per capita income for the village was $32,251. About 2.7% of families and 8.0% of the population were below the poverty line, including 4.6% of those under age 18 and 14.5% of those age 65 or over.

Note: the US Census treats Hispanic/Latino as an ethnic category. This table excludes Latinos from the racial categories and assigns them to a separate category. Hispanics/Latinos can be of any race.

Government
Thornton is in Illinois's 2nd congressional district.

References

External links
Village of Thornton official website

Villages in Illinois
Villages in Cook County, Illinois
Chicago metropolitan area
Populated places established in 1834
1834 establishments in Illinois